Geghard (also Romanized as Geghart; formerly, Artiz) is a village in the Kotayk Province of Armenia.  The UNESCO World Heritage Site of Geghard monastery is located southeast of Geghard village, near Goght.

See also 
Kotayk Province

References 

Populated places in Kotayk Province